Asmaiza binti Ahmad is a Malaysian politician and has served as Perlis State Executive Councillor until November 2022.

Election Results

References

Living people
People from Perlis
Malaysian people of Malay descent
Malaysian Muslims
United Malays National Organisation politicians
Members of the Perlis State Legislative Assembly
Perlis state executive councillors
21st-century Malaysian politicians
Year of birth missing (living people)